Brady Leisenring (born September 7, 1982, in Stowe, Vermont) is a former American professional ice hockey player current assistant coach with the Atlanta Gladiators of the ECHL.

Playing career
Leisenring was a standout hockey player for the University of Vermont Catamounts from 2001 to 2006. In his final season at UVM he broke John LeClair's all-time record of most points by a Vermont born player with 117. After the end of the 2005–06 season at UVM, he signed an amateur try-out contract with the Cleveland Barons of the American Hockey League. The next season following his 3-game stint in the AHL Leisenring participated with the San Jose Sharks' prospects in what was called “Pacific Division Shootout”, featuring rookies from the Los Angeles Kings, Anaheim Ducks and Phoenix Coyotes. San Jose would send him to their minor league affiliate the Worcester Sharks. Leisenring would play 27 games for Worcester over the next two season. After several stops he then joined the Hannover Indians in the German 2.GBun for the 2009–10 season.

After spending the 2010–11 season in North America with namely the Kalamazoo Wings and Bridgeport Sound Tigers, Leisenring returned to Germany signing a one-year contract with ESV Kaufbeuren of the 2nd Bundeliga on June 7, 2011. He next headed to Sweden and spent two seasons with VIK Västerås HK, along with a stint with Heilbronner Falken in Germany.

Coaching career
In 2014, Leisenring signed on with the Esbjerg Energy of the Danish Metal Ligaen. After appearing in 16 games, Leisenring retired and took an assistant coaching position with the team. In 2017, Leisenring returned stateside and was named an assistant coach of the Atlanta Gladiators in the ECHL.

Career statistics

Regular season and playoffs

International

Awards and honors

References

External links 

1982 births
American men's ice hockey forwards
Bridgeport Sound Tigers players
Cleveland Barons (2001–2006) players
Fresno Falcons players
Kalamazoo Wings (ECHL) players
Living people
Odessa Jackalopes players
People from Stowe, Vermont
Vermont Catamounts men's ice hockey players
Worcester Sharks players
Ice hockey people from Vermont